Pik Wui is one of the 25 constituencies in the Sham Shui Po District.

Created for the 2019 District Council elections, the constituency returns one district councillor to the Sham Shui Po District Council, with an election every four years.

Pik Wui loosely covers the residential flats such as Aqua Marine surrounding the Nam Cheong MTR station. It has projected population of 13,376.

Councillors represented

Election results

2010s

References

Nanchang
Constituencies of Hong Kong
Constituencies of Sham Shui Po District Council
2019 establishments in Hong Kong
Constituencies established in 2019